The 1978 South American Championships was a men's Grand Prix tennis circuit tournament held in Buenos Aires, Argentina and played on outdoor clay courts. The event was held from 20 November through 26 November 1978. Fourth-seeded José Luis Clerc won the singles title.

Finals

Singles

 José Luis Clerc defeated  Victor Pecci 6–4, 6–4
 It was Clerc's 2nd singles title of the year and of his career.

Doubles
 Chris Lewis /  Van Winitsky defeated  José Luis Clerc /  Belus Prajoux 6–4, 3–6, 6–0
 It was Lewis' 3rd title of the year and the 5th of his career. It was Winitsky's 2nd title of the year and the 2nd of his career.

References

External links 
 ITF tournament edition details
 ATP tournament profile

South American Championships
ATP Buenos Aires
South Am
November 1978 sports events in South America